State Highway 82 (SH 82) is a state highway in the U.S. state of Texas that runs  from the Louisiana border as a continuation of Louisiana Highway 82 to the East Texas city of Port Arthur. A roadway existed from at least 1970, when the Gulfgate Bridge (later renamed Martin Luther King Bridge) was completed; the route was designated SH 82 in 1975. The designation had previously applied to a route in West Texas, from 1923 to 1958.

History

Pecos, Ward, and Winkler Counties

SH 82 was originally designated on August 21, 1923, on a route from the West Texas town of Monahans south to Fort Stockton, with a planned extension south to Sanderson, replacing part of SH 17. On October 16, 1928, SH 82 was extended north to Kermit. On June 25, 1929, SH 82 was extended north to the New Mexico border. The planned extension to Sanderson was transferred to newly designated U.S. Highway 285 (cosigned since 1935) on September 26, 1939. On February 27, 1958, the remainder of the route was renumbered as SH 18, to coordinate with its intersection with New Mexico State Road 18.

Jefferson County
On January 29, 1975, SH 82 was designated over its current route in Jefferson County from SH 87 to Louisiana Highway 82. On January 7, 1987, the route was extended  to SH 73 incorporating the former Spur 214. The section west of Sabine Pass was previously proposed on September 19, 1956, as SH 362 (for access to the proposed levee; to be cancelled when construction was completed), but the designation was changed to FM 1900 on December 13, 1956 (still was to be cancelled when construction was completed), and FM 1900 was completed, and FM 1900 was cancelled on October 30, 1958, due to completion of construction.

Major junctions

References

External links

Transportation in Jefferson County, Texas
082